The Women's Hammer Throw event at the 2006 European Championships in Gothenburg, Sweden had a total number of 40 participating athletes. The final was held on Tuesday August 8, 2006, and the qualifying round on Monday August 7, 2006 with the mark set at 70.00 metres.

Medalists

Schedule
All times are Central European Time (UTC+1)

Abbreviations
All results shown are in metres

Records

Qualification

Group A

Group B

Final

See also
 2006 Hammer Throw Year Ranking

References
 todor66
 Official results

Hammer Throw
Hammer throw at the European Athletics Championships
2006 in women's athletics